Josif Jovanović Šakabenta (Irig, Habsburg monarchy, 1743 – Vršac, Habsburg Monarchy, 31 December 1805) was the bishop of the Serbian Orthodox Church on the throne of Sremski Karlovci and Vršac. He was Zaharije Orfelin's friend and patron.

Life
Josif Jovanović Šakabenta was born in 1743 in Irig to reverend father Andrija Jovanović, the younger brother of Patriarch Arsenije IV Jovanović Šakabenta and Peško Jovanović Šakabenta. Priest Andrija died in 1759. The brothers, Arsenije, Andrija, and Peško and their family members, were granted Hungarian nobility on 11 September 1746.

Josif was ordained a presbyter and later elevated once again in 1774 by the Metropolitan Vićentije Jovanović Vidak to archimandrite.

On 31 July 1781, Metropolitan Mojsije Putnik consecrated him to the Bishop of Pakrac-Slavonian and the entire Generality of Varaždin. One of the first and most important jobs that the new Bishop of Pakrac had to do was suppress the union because it was at this time that it started a new and very lively action in the General Staff of Varaždin.

During his visit to the parishes in the Varaždin Generalate in 1782, Bishop Josif received all the deceived Serbs back into Orthodoxy and "took vigorous steps to allow all the repentant unidentified people to return to Orthodoxy. Now there was a great persecution of all who declared that they were returning to Orthodoxy, and at the beginning of 1783, they were full of dungeons, especially in Belovar." In less than three years, Bishop Josif has plowed a deep furrow in Slavonia. He "required the clergy to teach their people the truths of faith and morality"  and paid special attention to the secret confession and gave special instructions to the priests. Given the greater number of chaplains in the diocese, he regulated the relations between parish priests and chaplains. The fruitful work was interrupted by the transfer of Bishop Josif to the Diocese of Bačka, where he remained for two years, from 1784 to 1786. He was installed for the Diocese of Bačka by the Vice-Bishop Joseph Kovač and Bishop of Pakrac Pavle Avakumović on 25 April 1784.

Bishop Josif showed his organizational skills in the Diocese of Vršac and Diocese of Caransebeș and much more. At his request, he was transferred in 1786 to the bishop of Vršac. In Vršac he founded a grammar school and a boarding school next to it. In 1793, he rebuilt the Mesić Monastery, which was demolished by the Turks and was given the status of a free royal city by Vršac. As a member of the Timișoara Parliament in 1790, he fought for the establishment of the Serbian Duchy. In 1791 he received the title of the royal consular officer and in 1792, with other Orthodox bishops - a member and "magnate" of the assembly of the Hungarian Parliament.

He died in Vršac on 31 December 1805, and was buried in the Parish Church of St. Nicholas in a crypt in the nave.

References 

Bishops of Bačka
1743 births
1805 deaths
People from Irig, Serbia